This article contains an overview of the year 1979 in athletics.

Major Events

World
World Cross Country Championships
World Cup

Regional

African Championships
Asian Championships
CARIFTA Games
Central American and Caribbean Championships
European Indoor Championships
Pan American Games
South American Championships
South American Youth Championships
Summer Universiade

World records

Men

Women

Season's bests

Notes

References

1979 in athletics (track and field)
Athletics (track and field) by year